Tirelli is a surname. Notable people with the surname include:

 Alicia Tirelli (born 1985), American-born Puerto Rican retired footballer
 Davide Tirelli (born 1966), Italian middle-distance runner
 Mario Tirelli (born 1906), Italian entomologist
 Mattia Tirelli (born 2002), Italian professional footballer
 Umberto Tirelli (1928–1992), Italian tailor

See also
 Palazzo Cassoli – Tirelli, building in Reggio Emilia
 Palazzo Tirelli, building in Reggio Emilia
 Tirelli Costumi, Rome-based costume house

Italian-language surnames